A Conspiracy of Faith (Danish: Flaskepost fra P), also known as Department Q: A Conspiracy of Faith, is a 2016 Danish film, directed by Hans Petter Moland, based on a novel by Jussi Adler-Olsen. It is the third film in the Department Q series, after The Keeper of Lost Causes (2013) and The Absent One (2014).

Synopsis
An 8-year-old message in a bottle, written in blood, leads Detective Carl Morck and his assistant Assad to a series of child abductions from religious communities throughout Denmark. The majority of these abductions have not been reported for some reason, and some of them are suspected to have ended in murder.

 Cast 
 Nikolaj Lie Kaas – Carl Mørck
 Fares Fares – Assad
 Pål Sverre Hagen - Johannes
 Jakob Ulrich Lohmann - Elias
 Amanda Collin - Rakel
 Johanne Louise Schmidt - Rose Knudsen
 Søren Pilmark - Marcus Jacobsen

Reception
Ken Jaworowski of The New York Times''  praised the film's storyline construction, the mood, and the closing scene,  'beautifully blunt, ends it on the perfect note.'

References

External links 
 
 
 

2016 films
2010s crime thriller films
Danish crime thriller films
2010s Danish-language films
Films based on Danish novels
Films about child abduction
2010s serial killer films
Department Q
Films produced by Peter Aalbæk Jensen
Films produced by Louise Vesth